Somatidia websteriana is a species of beetle in the family Cerambycidae. It was described by Broun in 1909. It is known from New Zealand.

References

websteriana
Beetles described in 1909